POU domain, class 3, transcription factor 1 (also known as Oct-6) is a protein that in humans is encoded by the POU3F1 gene.

See also 
 Octamer transcription factor

References

Further reading

External links 
 

POU-domain proteins